The House of Mane Šulevski is a historical house in Galičnik that is listed as Cultural heritage of North Macedonia. It is in ownership of one branch of the family of Šulevski.

Family history

Notable members of the family 
 Stefo Šuleski ― а shepperd. He worked for Jovan Filipovski who was a local sheep owner. He was killed by bandits in 1909 near the local sheepfold called Nikiforica.
 Unnamed male who was killed and robbed by bandit in the place called Stopanče.

See also
House of Kuze Frčkovski
House of Gjorgji Pulevski
House of Petre and Mile Želčevski
House of Velimir Gjinovski
House of Mitre Gjozinski and Velimir Čangovski
Galičnik Wedding Festival

References

External links
 National Register of objects that are cultural heritage (List updated to December 31, 2012) (In Macedonian)
 Office for Protection of Cultural Heritage (In Macedonian)

Historic houses
Cultural heritage of North Macedonia
Galičnik